Hikkaduwa is a coastal town in Galle district of Sri Lanka. Hikkaduwa is a major tourist attraction in Sri Lanka and is known for its beaches and corals. Despite significant development in the last decade it is still home to the endangered and endemic purple-faced langur, an usually shy monkey species that can only be found in Sri Lanka's forests.
It is divided into three main areas that are (from north to south): the Sri Lankan village, the tourist area, and then Thiranagama.

Etymology
The name Hikkaduwa is thought to have been derived from the two words Sip Kaduwa, with Sip (සිප්) being the shorter version of Shilpaya which refers to knowledge in Sinhala and Kaduwa(කඩුව) which means sword. It is believed therefore that the name Hikkaduwa means sword of knowledge. Alternatively, it means coral or seashell jungle.
In the sixties, many hippies came to live in Hikkaduwa which was nicknamed 'Hippiduwa'.

Transport
Hikkaduwa is located on the Coastal or Southern Rail Line (connecting Colombo through to Matara). 
It is also located on the A2 highway, connecting Colombo to Wellawaya, which runs mostly parallel to the shore, through the town.

Economy
Hikkaduwa's economy was traditionally based on fishing and coconut cultivation. This was replaced by tourism when its golden sandy beaches were discovered. It is a well-known international destination for board surfing. The town was featured in an episode of Anthony Bourdain's television show No Reservations.

Hikkaduwa was affected by the tsunami caused by the 2004 Indian Ocean earthquake along with nearby villages Telwatta, Paraliya (site of the Queen of the Sea rail disaster), Dodanduwa, Kahawa and Rathgama. In the aftermath of the tsunami, many of the families who had lost everything were given sewing machines as part of the relief operations. As a result, the town has a multitude of tailors who will custom-make shirts, trousers, and shorts.

Attractions
 Hikkaduwa beach - reputed as the second-best surfing spot in Sri Lanka.
 Hikkaduwa Coral Sanctuary - located a few hundred metres offshore. The sanctuary has approximately seventy varieties of multi-coloured corals. These coral gardens have been placed under protection.
 The giant Buddha, Tsunami Honganji Vihara, built in remembrance of those that died in the tragedy.
 The Tsunami museum.

Notable people
 Hikkaduwe Sri Sumangala Thera

See also
 Hikkaduwa National Park
 Unawatuna

References

External links

Populated places in Galle District
Populated places in Southern Province, Sri Lanka
Seaside resorts in Sri Lanka